Drew Donovan is a fictional character from the soap opera Days of Our Lives. He was played by Charles Shaughnessy from September 8 to December 21, 1988, in February 2017 and again in September 2021 in Days of Our Lives: Beyond Salem.

Biography 
Drew Donovan is the identical twin brother of Shane Donovan and the son of Andrew and Margaret Donovan. In his early twenties, he joined the ISA along with his brother after leaving the military.

Drew Donovan is first seen in 1988, kidnapping Roman Brady's daughter, Carrie, under the alias Lago. He is an assassin that works for Stefano Di Mera and kills Ellen Hawk, Stefano's wife, and Benjy Hawk's mother.

He, Roman Brady (later retconned to John Black), and Jeremiah Brown are trained somewhere in Thailand by the kung-fu master Orion Hawk. He dates Calliope Jones and then kills Ambassador Chung, with Benjy becoming deaf after the building is destroyed.

After being shot and wounded, Drew escapes from Salem.

In early February 2017, Drew returns to the storyline surrounding the disappearance and supposed death of Stefano. He and his wife Camila become a target for Deimos Kiriakis over a device he created called Orwell which was also sought after by Di Mera and Eduardo Hernandez. Eventually, he implants a virus that renders the Orwell device useless and enters witness protection with Camila thanks to his brother Shane and Roman Brady.

He returned in the first season of Days of Our Lives: Beyond Salem where he reveals Camila died and he went back to his evil ways. He poses as his twin brother, Shane, conspires with Dimitri von Leuschner to steal Alamainian gemstones which Drew uses to connect with satellite lasers in space. He intended to use them to destroy various locations worldwide, including Salem. However, he was found out and stopped by John, Marlena, Shane, and Billie Reed before being sent to prison.

References

Donovan, Drew
Donovan, Drew
Donovan, Drew